William Herbert (by 1587 – 1645) was a Welsh politician who sat in the House of Commons in 1621.

Herbert was the elder son of Richard Herbert of Wernllwynwhith. He matriculated at Christ Church, Oxford on 17 October 1600, aged 17. He sold the estate of Wernllwynwhith and bought the manor of Rhymney and White Friars, Cardiff, where he built the Friars' House. In 1621, he was elected Member of Parliament for Cardiff. He was Mayor of Cardiff and Constable of Cardiff Castle in the time of King Charles I being appointed in September 1642 to seize it for the King, and to  collect the rents of the Earl of Pembroke.   
 
Herbert died  after 1645 when his estate was reckoned at £1,000 per year.

Herbert married Ann Hurst, and left his estate to his male heir William Herbert of St Fagan's, son of William Herbert who was killed at the Battle of Edgehill.

References

Members of the Parliament of England (pre-1707) for constituencies in Wales
Alumni of Christ Church, Oxford
Mayors of places in Wales
Politicians from Cardiff
17th-century Welsh politicians
English MPs 1621–1622
Year of birth uncertain
1645 deaths